Jordan Dodson (born 10 December 1987) is a New Zealand screenwriter and film director, based in Auckland. Jordan creates music videos and commercials as THUNDERLIPS, a directing-duo with Sean Wallace.

Career 
Dodson spent his teenage years directing extreme sports videos in Switzerland, and after working as a Make Up Artist on Roland Emmerich's 10,000BC, and an Assistant Editor on Andrew Adamson's The Chronicles of Narnia: Prince Caspian, Dodson returned to New Zealand in 2005, and has since written and co-written several feature films, and directed many short films, music videos and television commercials.

In 2012 Dodson's short film  Runaways, made in association with the New Zealand Film Commission and Candlelit Pictures Ltd, premiered in competition at the Montreal World Film Festival, and went on to play at the AFI Fest in Los Angeles in 2012.
 Runaways was shot on left-over 35mm film stock from the feature film Trade.

Dodson is a member of the Screen Directors Guild of New Zealand (SDGNZ). He works on films and music videos with Auckland-based production company Candlelit Pictures.

Filmography

References

External links
Dodson, Jordan. "Jordan Dodson IMDB", IMDb, Worldwide. Retrieved on 25 April 2013.

1987 births
Living people
New Zealand screenwriters
Male screenwriters
New Zealand film directors